Al-Hawatiyiah is a town in east-central Yemen. It is located in the Hadhramaut Governorate.

External links
Towns and villages in the Hadhramaut Governorate

Populated places in Hadhramaut Governorate